= Henry Grady Yonce =

American politician

Member of the South Carolina House of Representatives
- In office 1962–1971

Personal details
- Born: November 18, 1928
- Died: March 30, 2012 (aged 83)
- Education: University of South Carolina

Henry Grady Yonce (November 18, 1928 – March 30, 2012) was an American politician. He served as a member of the South Carolina House of Representatives.

== Life and career ==
Yonce attended the University of South Carolina.

In 1962, Yonce was elected to the South Carolina House of Representatives, representing Richland County, South Carolina.

Yonce died on March 30, 2012, at the age of 83.
